The Camacho River (Spanish, Río Camacho) is a river of Bolivia. It is a tributary of the Río Grande de Tarija, which in turn flows into the Bermejo River and the Paraguay River.

See also
List of rivers of Bolivia

References

Rand McNally, The New International Atlas, 1993.

Rivers of Tarija Department
Tributaries of the Paraguay River